is a former Japanese football player.

Playing career
Imagawa was born in Tokyo on May 17, 1980. He joined the J2 League club Vegalta Sendai (formerly Brummell Sendai) as part of the youth team in 1999. He debuted against Consadole Sapporo on August 1, 1999. He played three matches during the 1999 season. However, he did not play at all in 2000 and retired at the end of the season.

Club statistics

References

External links

1980 births
Living people
Association football people from Tokyo
Japanese footballers
J2 League players
Vegalta Sendai players
Association football midfielders